Cave Hill Farm is a historical farm at 9780 Cave Hill Road in McGaheysville, Virginia.  The centerpiece of the farm is its main house, a two-story brick house with Federal and Greek Revival characteristics.  The farm is named for a cave that is located on a limestone outcrop on the north side of Cave Hill Road.  It is the source of a spring on the property, and was historically used for food storage.  Since 1868 the property has been in the hands of Mann family descendants, the Hopkins, who operate a bed and breakfast inn.

The farm was listed on the National Register of Historic Places in 2011.

See also
National Register of Historic Places listings in Rockingham County, Virginia

References

External links
Cave Hill Farm Bed and Breakfast

National Register of Historic Places in Rockingham County, Virginia
Greek Revival houses in Virginia
Federal architecture in Virginia
Buildings and structures completed in 1847
Rockingham County, Virginia
1847 establishments in Virginia
Farms on the National Register of Historic Places in Virginia